Quinta da Graça is a village on São Tomé Island in São Tomé and Príncipe. Its population is 58 (2012 census). It lies directly east of Monte Café, 2 km west of Batepá.

Population history

References

Populated places in Mé-Zóchi District